Golestan Province ((Golestân), Ostâne Golestân) is one of the 31 provinces of Iran, located in the northeast of the country and southeast of the Caspian Sea. Its capital is Gorgan, formerly called Esterabad until 1937. Golestan was split off from Mazandaran province in 1997.

The province was made a part of Region 1 upon the division of the provinces into 5 regions, solely for coordination and development purposes, on 22 June 2014. Majority of its population are Sunni Muslims.

At the 2006 census, the province's population was 1,593,055 in 379,354 households. The following census in 2011 showed an increase in population to 1,777,014 in 482,842 households. At the most recent census conducted in 2016, the population had risen to 1,868,819 in 550,249 households.

Etymology
Gulistan, Golestan, or Golastan translates to "gul-" meaning "flower" and "-stan" meaning "land" or "region." Golestan, therefore, literally means "land of flowers" in Iranian languages (e.g., Persian, Kurdish, and Mazandarani.  This is a common toponym in countries with Persian linguistic roots (see Gulistan).

The capital of Gorgan derives its name from a wider region known historically as Gorgân, Middle Persian Gurgān, and Old Persian Varkāna (in the Behistun Inscription) meaning "land of wolves". This is also the root of the Ancient Greek Ὑρκανία (Hyrkanía) and Latin Hyrcania.  Wild wolves are still found in Golestan.

History

Human settlements in this area date back to 10,000 BC. Evidence of the ancient city of Jorjan can still be seen near the current city of Gonbad-e Kavus. It was an important city of Persia located on the Silk Road.

Under the Achaemenid Iran, it seems to have been administered as a sub-province of Parthia and is not named separately in the provincial lists of Darius and Xerxes. The Hyrcanians, however, under the leadership of Megapanus, are mentioned by Herodotus in his list of Xerxes' army during the invasion of Greece.

Administrative divisions

Cities 
According to the 2016 census, 1,015,774 people (over 54% of the population of Golestan province) live in the following cities: Aliabad-e Katul 52,838, Anbar Olum 7,003, Aqqala 35,116, Azadshahr 43,760, Bandar Torkaman 53,970, Bandar-e Gaz 20,742, Daland 20,754, Faraqi 5,777, Fazelabad 19,461, Galikash 23,394, Gomishan 19,191, Gonbad-e Kavus 151,910, Gorgan 350,676, Incheh Borun 2,494, Jelin 7,417, Kalaleh 36,176, Khan Bebin 10,878, Kordkuy 39,881, Maraveh Tappeh 8,671, Mazraeh 4,009, Minudasht 30,085, Neginshahr 8,138, Now Deh Khanduz 2,989, Now Kandeh 6,650, Ramian 12,426, Sangdevin 4,203, Sarkhon Kalateh 7,589, Siminshahr 17,205, and Tatar-e Olya 4,782.

Demographics

In 2006, the Ministry of Education of Iran estimated the ethnic breakdown of the province to be:

 Turkmens: 34.20%
 Mazandaranis: 30.40%
 Sistanis & Persians: 14.90%
 Baluchis: 10.90%
 Qizilbash: 7.30%
 Others (including Azeris, Kazakhs, Kurds, Armenians and Georgians): 2.3%

Apparently, the Mazandaranis who inhabit the foothills all the way to Shah Pasand were subsumed under the rubric "Persian" by this official statistics.

The Persians/Mazandaranis are considered by nearly all inhabitants of the province to be "the old natives" while all others are considered ethnic immigrants in the past.

Most Mazandaranis live in Gorgan, Ali Abad, Kordkuy, Bandar-e Gaz and Gonbad-e Kavus. They speak Mazanderani language.

The Turkmens reside in the north of the province, a plain called Turkmen Sahra. From the 15th century, these formerly nomadic people have lived in this area, the main cities, of which are Gonbad-e Kavus and Bandar Torkaman. Turkmens are Sunni Muslim. They are a sizable minority in cities such as Gorgan, Ali Abad, Kalaleh and many eastern townships.

Azeris and the Qizilbash predate the Turkmen by centuries and have in time become completely Shia, and therefore, culturally associate with the Persians and other Shias.

The Sistani Persians and the Baluch are relatively of recent arrival and date back to the early 20th century. They are still arriving in the area in some numbers due to the lasting drought in their home areas of Sistan.

The people of Kordkuy are originally from the Kurdish areas of west Iran, Kermanshah and Kurdistan provinces. They belong to the Kord-rostami tribe and are also found in significant numbers in other cities like Gorgan and Bandare Gaz.

Other ethnic groups such as Kazakhs, Kurds, Georgians, and Armenians also reside in this area, and have preserved their traditions and rituals.

A small minority of Baháʼí Faith also live in Golestan (in Shahpasand).

Culture

The world's tallest brick structure of its kind, the Gonbad-e Qabus tower, stands in this province.

Climate and geography

Golestan enjoys mild weather and a temperate climate most of the year. Geographically, it is divided into two sections: The plains, and the mountains of the Alborz range. In the eastern Alborz section, the direction of mountains faces northeast and gradually decreases in height. The highest point of the province is Shavar, with a height of 3,945 meters. Two of the main rivers are the Gharasu and Gorganrud.

Golestan National Park

Golestan National Park in northern Iran is faced with the construction of a road through the forest, allegedly for the ease of traffic for the villagers and woodmen but at the expense of losing the only national park in Iran throughout which a range of different climates (humidity near the Caspian Sea and desert farther south) is spread.

Golestan National Park is Iran's biggest national park which spans three provinces, Golestan, Mazandaran and North Khorasan. Surprisingly, the authorities ignore repeated calls by experts to construct such roads around, instead of through, the forests, which in this way would no longer threaten the animal and plant life.

Colleges and universities
 Golestan University
 Golestan University of Medical Sciences
 Gonbad Kavous University
 Gorgan University of Agricultural Sciences and Natural Resources
 Islamic Azad University of Azadshahr
 Islamic Azad University of Gorgan
 Islamic Azad University of Ali Abad katool

References

External links

The Provincial Cultural Heritage Organization

 
Provinces of Iran